Barbed Wire may refer to

Barbed wire
Barbed wire
Razor wire

Film
 Barbed Wire (1927 film), a war film starring Pola Negri
 Barbed Wire (1952 film), a Western film starring Gene Autry

Other
 BarbedWire Studios, developers of the video game Gates of Hell
 Barbed Wire, a 2000 album by rock and roll guitarist Link Wray
 Barbed Wire, an American Anarcho-punk band from Denver, Colorado
 Barbed Wire, a novel by Máirtín Ó Cadhain, published posthumously in 2002
 "Barbed Wire", a song by Kendrick Lamar from the 2010 album Overly Dedicated

See also
Barb Wire